Paul Stewart (born June 1955) is a writer of children's books, best known for three series written in collaboration with the illustrator Chris Riddell: The Edge Chronicles, the Free Lance novels, and the Far Flung Adventures series.

Background

Stewart was born in London in 1955. His family lived first in Muswell Hill, North London and later in Morden, South London, where he went to school. His favourite subject at school was English and he hated Mathematics. When Stewart left school, he went travelling, spending several months in Greece, where he took various jobs, including picking oranges and grapes, and whitewashing hotels.

From 1974 to 1977, Stewart studied at the University of Lancaster, majoring in English, (which included a Creative Writing unit) with a minor in Religious Education. On graduation, he went travelling again, before enrolling in 1978 to do an M.A. in Creative Writing with Angela Carter and Malcolm Bradbury at the University of East Anglia. He went to Heidelberg, Germany in 1979 for three years, both as a teacher of English and as a student at Heidelberg University, learning German. In 1982, he went to Sri Lanka 
to teach English as a foreign language returning to the UK a year later where he continued to teach (1983–90) before becoming a full-time writer.

Stewart's first book to be published was The Thought Domain (1988) which was then followed by a number of other children's and young adult novels, chiefly in the thriller, horror and SF/Fantasy genres. Stewart's only adult book to date, Trek, was published in 1991.

Literary influences

Stewart's favourite books when a child were The Phantom Tollbooth by Norton Juster, Lewis Carroll's Alice in Wonderland, Rupert Bear Annuals, and the works of Alan Garner, especially Elidor. He also read a lot of science fiction.

Stewart started writing at a very young age. At the age of seven he was writing a series about a snail called Oliver and he started a sequel to The Phantom Tollbooth at ten. Some of the ideas from this early work were later developed and became the basis of The Thought Domain which was published in 1988.

Collaboration with Chris Riddell

Stewart first met Chris Riddell in 1993, through having children at the same school. Riddell was looking for someone to write texts that he could illustrate. Stewart had already had a number of books published. Their first collaborative work were the Rabbit and Hedgehog books (published 1998–2003 by Andersen Press). The inspiration for The Edge Chronicles came from a map Riddell drew of an imaginary world in 1994 and then challenged Stewart to write about it. The first book in the sequence, Beyond the Deepwoods, was commissioned by Transworld Publishers (now part of the Random House Group) on the basis of the map and the first four chapters. The book then took three years to write as Stewart and Riddell worked out both the plot and how best to work together. Originally commissioned as a single book, Stewart and Riddell hoped that it might become a trilogy. The series has now extended to fifteen full-length novels, five short stories, a book of maps and a now-defunct blog called Weird New Worlds. The final book, The Descenders, was released in 2019.

When writing together, Stewart and Riddell work on the development of plots and characters together, sometimes starting from a bit of writing, sometimes from an illustration on one of Riddell's sketchbooks. They have long conversations over many days, during which the novels emerge.  They don't always agree and the debates can become quite heated but they have remained good friends. Following these discussions, Stewart normally writes a first draft, which Riddell will edit or rewrite before Stewart produces a final draft.

As well as The Edge Chronicles, Stewart and Riddell have also collaborated on a trilogy of shorter adventures, Freelance; a quartet of younger books, The Far Flung Adventures, the first of which, Fergus Crane, won the Nestlé Smarties Book Prize (Gold Medal) in 2004; The Blobheads series (2000–2004); Muddle Earth (2003), and a further quartet, Barnaby Grimes (2007–2009). Their latest novel, Wyrmeweald trilogy, was published by Doubleday Children's Books in April 2010.

Personal life 
Stewart lives in the British seaside city of Brighton with his wife and children.

Awards

These three books constitute the Far Flung Adventures series, written by Stewart and illustrated by Riddell.
 2004 Nestlé Smarties Book Prize Gold Medal, age category 6–8 years: Fergus Crane
 2005 Nestlé Smarties Book Prize Silver Medal, age category 6–8 years: Corby Flood
 2006 Nestlé Smarties Book Prize Silver Medal, age category 6–8 years: Hugo Pepper

Bibliography

Fiction
 The Thought Domain, illustrated by Jon Riley. London: Viking, 1988; New York: Puffin, 1989
 The Weather Witch, illustrated by Jon Riley. London: Viking, 1989; New York: Puffin, 1990
 Adam's Ark, illustrated by Kevin Jones. London: Viking, 1990; New York: Puffin, 1992
 Giant Gutso and the Wacky Gang, illustrated by Colin West. London: Orchard, 1991
 Rory McCory's Nightmare Machine, illustrated by Paul Finn. London: Viking, 1992; New York: Puffin, 1993
 The Snowman Who Couldn't Melt, illustrated by Annabel Large. London: Viking, 1993; New York: Puffin, 1994
 Bubble and Shriek, illustrated by Annabel Large. London: Viking, 1993: New York: Puffin, 1995
 Castle of Intrigue, illustrated by Jane Gedye. London: Usborne, 1994
 Neighbourhood Witch, illustrated by Annabel Large. London: Viking, 1994; New York: Puffin, 1995
 Stage Fright, illustrated by Alan Marks. London: Usborne, 1995
 Brown Eyes. London: Penguin, 1996; new edition, Longman, 1999
 The Diary. London: Penguin, 1996
 The Clock of Doom. London: Usborne, 1996
 The Wakening. London: Yearling, 1996
 Football Mad series. London: Hippo
 Football Mad, 1997
 Football Mad: Off-Side!, 1998
 Football Mad: Hat-Trick!, 1999
 Football Mad: Teamwork!, 2000
 Football Mad: Own Goal!, 2020
 The Midnight Hand. London: Yearling, 1997
 Lucky Luke and Other very Short Stories. London: Penguin, 1997
 Dogbird, illustrated by Tony Ross. London: Corgi, 1998
 The Hanging Tree. London: Scholastic, 1998
 Millie's Party, illustrated by Bernard Lodge. London: Blue Bananas, 1999
 Freight Train. London: Scholastic, 2000
 Sausage, illustrated by Nick Ward. Oxford: Oxford University Press, 2002
 The Were-Pig, illustrated by Tony Ross. London: Corgi, 2002
 The Watch-Frog, illustrated by Tony Ross. London: Corgi, 2003

For adults
 Trek. London: Jonathan Cape, 1991; reissued Corgi, 2007

Picture books
 Rabbit & Hedgehog Series (all illustrated by Chris Riddell)
 The Birthday Presents London: Andersen Press, 1998; New York: HarperCollins, 2000
 A Little Bit of Winter. London: Andersen Press, 1998; New York: HarperCollins, 1999
 Rabbit's Wish. London: Andersen Press, 2001; New York: HarperCollins, 2001
 What Do You Remember?. London: Andersen Press, 2002
 Brian the Brave. Hereford: Otter-Barry Books, 2021

Fiction co-authored with Chris Riddell

 Muddle Earth. London: Macmillan, 2003; New York: Yearling, 2009
 Muddle Earth Too. London: Macmillan, 2011

The Edge Chronicles

 Beyond the Deepwoods. London: Doubleday, 1998; New York: David Fickling Books, 2004
 Stormchaser. London: Doubleday, 1999; New York: David Fickling Books, 2004
 Midnight Over Sanctaphrax. London: Doubleday, 2000; New York: David Fickling Books, 2004
 The Curse of the Gloamglozer. London: Doubleday, 2001; New York: David Fickling Books, 2005
 Cloud Wolf. (published for World Book Day 2001). London: Corgi, 2001
 The Last of the Sky Pirates. London: Doubleday, 2002; New York: David Fickling Books, 2005
 Vox. London: Doubleday, 2003; New York: David Fickling Books, 2005
 The Stone Pilot. (published for World Book Day 2006). London: Corgi, 2006
 Freeglader. London: Doubleday, 2004; New York: David Fickling Books, 2006
 The Winter Knights. London: Doubleday, 2005; New York: David Fickling Books, 2007
 Clash of the Skygalleons. London: Doubleday, 2006; New York: David Fickling Books, 2007
 The Lost Barkscrolls. London: Doubleday, 2007
 The Immortals. London: Doubleday, 2009; New York: David Fickling Books 2010
 The Nameless One - Book 1 of the Cade Saga. London: Doubleday, 2015
 Doombringer - Book 2 of the Cade Saga. London: Doubleday, 2015
 The Descenders - Book 3 of the Cade Saga. London: Doubleday, 2019

The Blobheads
All published by London: Macmillan.
 Invasion of the Blobs. 2000
 Talking Toasters. 2000
 School Stinks. 2000
 Beware of the Babysitter. 2000
 Garglejuice. 2000
 Silly Billy. 2000
 Naughty Gnomes. 2000
 Purple Alert!. 2000
 Blobheads go Boing! 2004

A Knight's Story
 Free Lance and the Lake of Skulls. London: Hodder, 2003; New York: (published as Lake of Skulls) Atheneum, 2004
 Free Lance and the Field of Blood. London: Hodder, 2004; New York: (published as Joust of Honor) Atheneum, 2005
 Free Lance and the Dragon's Hoard. London: Hodder, 2005; New York: (published as Dragon's Hoard) Atheneum, 2005

Far Flung Adventures
 Fergus Crane. London: Doubleday, 2004; New York: David Fickling Books, 2006
 Corby Flood. London: Doubleday, 2005; New York: David Fickling Books, 2006
 Hugo Pepper. London: Doubleday, 2006; New York: David Fickling Books, 2007

Barnaby Grimes

 Barnaby Grimes: The Curse of the Nightwolf. London: Doubleday, 2007; New York: David Fickling Books, 2008
 Barnaby Grimes: Return of the Emerald Skull. London: Doubleday, 2008; New York: David Fickling Books, 2009
 Barnaby Grimes: Legion of the Dead. London: Doubleday, 2008; New York: David Fickling Books, 2010
 Barnaby Grimes: Phantom of Blood Alley. London: Doubleday, 2009; New York: David Fickling Books, 2010

Wyrmeweald Trilogy
 Wyrmeweald: Returner's Wealth. London: Doubleday, 2010
 Wyrmeweald: Bloodhoney. London: Doubleday, 2012
 Wyrmeweald: The Bone Trail. London: Doubleday, 2013

References

External links

 About Paul & Chris (official, archived 5 December 2013)
 Official Random House site
 Official Barnaby Grimes site
 Edge Chronicles fansite
 ACHUKA biographical sketch and interview
  Paul Stewart's Top 5 Books for 6-8 year olds, The Guardian, 23 March 2005
  Audio interview with Paul Stewart and Chris Riddell; Scottish Book Trust, 2009, Retrieved 13 February 2010
 Dispatches from the Deepwoods
 

1955 births
English children's writers
20th-century English novelists
21st-century English novelists
Alumni of the University of East Anglia
Living people
Date of birth missing (living people)
Place of birth missing (living people)
English male novelists
20th-century English male writers
21st-century English male writers